, also known as 2×2 = Shinobuden, is a Japanese manga series written and illustrated by Ryoichi Koga. The series subtitle is "The Nonsense Kunoichi Fiction". The manga was serialized in MediaWorks' Dengeki Daioh magazine between August 2000 and March 2006; the chapters were later compiled into four tankōbon volumes. The manga was released in English in North America by Infinity Studios under the title Ninin Ga Shinobuden. A 12-episode anime adaptation produced by Ufotable aired in Japan between July and September 2004. The anime has been released in North America by The Right Stuf International under the title Ninja Nonsense: The Legend of Shinobu. A sequel manga titled Ninin ga Shinobuden Plus began serialization on Kadokawa Corporation's Comic Newtype website in June 2020.

Ninja Nonsense is an absurdist comedy series which follows a young woman named Shinobu as she trains to become a ninja. However, the series does not only focus on ninja training, but also focuses on Shinobu's lifestyle and friends through a series of disjointed comedic plot lines. The series uses character designs that favor a soft and rounded look rather than the slender bishōjo style. The original title of the series is based on a pun. In the Japanese numerical system, ni is two, and shi is four. Ni (2) × ni (2) = shi (4), therefore Ni-ni-n ga Shi-nobuden.

Plot
Ninja Nonsense is an absurdist comedy centering on Shinobu, a ninja apprentice, who is attempting to pass her ninja exams while Kaede, a normal schoolgirl, studies for her school exams. As a part of her exam, Shinobu is ordered to break into Kaede's room to steal her panties by her instructor, Onsokumaru. Shinobu, who despite her enthusiasm, possesses little if any actual ninja skills, believes herself to be invisible and 'sneaks' into Kaede's room. Since Shinobu is perfectly visible to Kaede, the mission does not go as planned. Despite all of this, Kaede takes pity on Shinobu and the two become close friends. Shinobu trains alongside other male ninjas identical in appearance, though one is known as Sasuke.

Characters

 The title character is kind, hardworking, and dedicated, but naive ninja who is somewhat clumsy with complex tasks. She is usually charged with taking care of her dojo, because everyone else is too lazy. She usually wears a purple and pink ninja outfit, but sometimes wears other costumes. Her ambiguous relationship with Kaede, whom she describes as "more than a friend but less than a lover", ranges from admiration and idolization to romantic interest. Despite the influence of Onsokumaru, she remains fairly innocent.

Kaede is an ordinary high school student attending Shirazuchi High School, Shinobu's classmate and the straight man character of the series. She does not allow herself to be tormented and usually puts annoying people in their place. She is often shown making remarks about how Onsokumaru and the male ninja are annoying.

Onsokumaru is a shape-shifting creature; his name roughly translates to "sonic speed ball". He is usually depicted as a round, yellow sphere with a face, variably with wings or arms, deep voice and a loud temperament. Often, when getting emotional, he will transform into an extremely muscular full human body. In spite of being such a bizarre creature, he is the leader of Shinobu's ninja clan. Onsokumaru is perverted, lecherous, messy, loud, a cheat and greedy. He imagines softcore pornographic fantasies about Shinobu and Kaede, either for his own personal pleasure or to enthrall or persuade the male ninja into helping him. On the other hand, he is often friendly and has a silly, playful side.

Miyabi is Shinobu's younger sister who has chosen the field of "magical summoning" rather than ninjutsu. She mutally dislikes Onsokumaru and believes that her elder sister should switch fields and become a magical summoner like herself. Though just ten years old, she is something of a prodigy and is skilled enough to consistently defeat Onsokumaru when he gets on her nerves.

 (Japanese), David Wills (ep 1-3), Jason Linder (ep 4-12) (English)
Sasuke is the class president of the Igumi Ninja Academy. Sasuke is sometimes easy to spot, but he is one of the dozens of faceless male ninja in the series. These male ninja are seen in different outfits, but never without their masks. Onsokumaru and Shinobu seem able to tell them apart. They share many of Onsokumaru's traits, although they are more kindhearted and conscientious, attempting to act noble and wise. They often join in on Onsokumaru's perverted schemes, but have shown a distaste for certain levels he will go to. The ninja have even more than once joined together to punish Onsokumaru when he goes too far. They have a tendency to act with a hive mind, but are easily distracted and get little done. Sasuke and some of the other male ninja form the "Miyabi Fan Club".

Media

Manga
The manga is written and illustrated by Ryoichi Koga. It was serialized in MediaWorks' shōnen manga magazine Dengeki Daioh between the August 2000 and March 2006 issues. The chapters were collected into four tankōbon volumes under the Dengeki Comics EX imprint between February 2002 and May 2006. The manga is released in English in North America under the title Ninin Ga Shinobuden by Infinity Studios, who released the volumes between May 2006 and April 2008. A sequel manga titled Ninin ga Shinobuden Plus began serialization on Kadokawa Corporation's Comic Newtype website on June 26, 2020. As of October 2022, the chapters have been collected into two tankōbon volumes.

Drama CDs
A drama CD based on the manga titled Ninpō Drama CD Ninin ga Shinobuden: Bloom was released in May 2003. Three more drama CDs were released between June and October 2004 alongside the anime and feature the same cast as the anime. Although most of the cast from the original drama CD was different, Norio Wakamoto was the only voice actor who retained his voice in the anime as Onsokumaru. A fifth drama CD was included as a bonus CD for the "fandisc" DVD released in Japan in 2005.

Anime
A 12-episode anime television series adaptation, produced by Ufotable and directed by Hitoyuki Matsui, aired between July 8 and September 23, 2004 on Chubu-Nippon Broadcasting in Japan. An insert song used in episode five is titled  by Nana Mizuki. The English dub was produced by NYAV Post, with Marc Diraison and Michael Sinterniklaas as voice directors. It was released by Right Stuf in North America originally across four DVD volumes from July 25 to November 28, 2006 under their Nozomi Entertainment label. A DVD box set was released on December 7, 2007 and was re-released with bonus materials on June 8, 2010. A Blu-ray collection was released on January 2, 2018. In 2020, Frontier Works re-released the anime television series to celebrate the manga's 20th anniversary.

Reception
The anime series of Ninja Nonsense has received generally favorable reviews since its release by Right Stuf Inc. in North America. Positive reception has been given regarding its gag style comedy, the animation, and the cast of characters. T.H.E.M Anime rated the anime 4 out of 5 stars, saying that "Ninja Nonsense is hardly highbrow stuff, but it's clever enough to be amusing and just up the alley of those who want a good gag-laden comedy." Carl Kimlinger, from Anime News Network, praised the anime for its varied animation styles as well as its quality, stating that, "The only constants are that, no matter what style of animation used, no matter how distorted or wild the art, it is always appropriate to the joke or mood of the moment." Furthermore, Kimlinger also credited the characters for their dynamic nature, however advised that marathoning the series can be difficult due to its pacing. In his review on The Fandom Post, Chris Beveridge credited the series for the twists it made to its episodic plots that would be cliche in its "slice of life" genre, highlighting funny moments from certain episodes, including the final episode, calling it "...a very satisfying close." Paul Jensen wrote that the show had a "narrow focus on absurd screwball humor, but did it very well" in his review for Anime News Network. Jensen also called the English dub noteworthy and praised Sean Schemmel's take on Onsokumaru.

References

External links
Ninja Nonsense at Ufotable 
Ninja Nonsense at Nozomi Entertainment

ASCII Media Works manga
Comedy anime and manga
Dengeki Comics
Dengeki Daioh
Kadokawa Dwango franchises
Ninja in anime and manga
Seinen manga
Shōnen manga
Ufotable